Steamboat Lake may refer to:

Steamboat Lake (Cass and Hubbard counties, Minnesota)
Steamboat Lake State Park, a state park in Colorado